Sautela is a 1999 Indian Hindi-language action drama film directed by T. Rama Rao, starring Mithun Chakraborty in the lead role. The film, a remake of Tamil-language film Cheran Pandiyan also introduced 3 South Indian Heroines, Priya Raman, Priyanka Upendra and Rajashree to Bollywood.

Plot
Raghuvir, the head of the village Panchayat, and Arjun are step-brothers who live separately. Arjun always respects his elder brother Raghuvir. Raguvir's wife and daughter also love Arjun, but Raghuvir openly dislikes him being the step-brother. One day local goons tried to rape Raghuvir's daughter and Arjun beats them. Without knowing the fact, Raghuvir punished Arjun. The Enemy of their family and local Don uses this hatred to their advantage.

Cast
Mithun Chakraborty as Arjun
Suresh Oberoi as Raghuvir
Priyanka Upendra as Raghuvir's daughter
Priya Raman
Vinay Anand
Gulshan Grover
Rami Reddy
Reema Lagoo as Raghuvir's wife
Vishwajeet Pradhan
Rajashree
Rohini Hattangadi
Ram Mohan

Music
"Dil Hai Deewana Mera" - Anuradha Paudwal, Abhijeet
"Behna Ri Pyari Pyari" - Kavita Krishnamurthy, Kumar Sanu
"Sapno Ki Rani Hai Deewani" - Anuradha Paudwal, Abhijeet
"Haule Haule Pyar Karo Na" - Kumar Sanu, Anuradha Paudwal
"Na Honge Hum Juda" - Kavita Krishnamurthy, Kumar Sanu
"Kismat Ne Dekho" - Indrajit Dasgupta

References

External links
 

1999 films
1990s Hindi-language films
Mithun's Dream Factory films
Films shot in Ooty
Hindi remakes of Tamil films
Films directed by T. Rama Rao
Films scored by Tabun
Indian action drama films